Gayne Whitman (born Alfred D. Vosburgh; March 19, 1890 – August 31, 1958) was an American radio and film actor. He appeared in more than 200 films between 1904 and 1957. In some early films he was credited under his birth name. He was born in Chicago, Illinois. 

Whitman's theatrical debut came when he carried a spear behind an actor portraying King Richard III in a production in Indianapolis.

As Allen Vosburgh, he was the leading man in the film Princess of the Dark (1917). Soon after that, he changed his screen name to Alfred Whitman because "1917 was not a good time to have a German sounding name."

Beginning in 1921, Whitman acted at the Morosco Theater in Los Angeles. He returned to films in 1925 when he received a contract with Warner Bros.

On radio, Whitman played the title role in Chandu the Magician, was the narrator on Lassie and Strange as It Seems, and was an announcer on Paducah Plantation and other programs.

Personal life
Whitman was married to Estelle Taylor, an actress with a stock theater company in St. Louis. On August 31, 1958, Whitman died of a heart attack in Los Angeles at age 68.

Selected filmography

 A Natural Man (1915, Short) - Karl Holden 
 The Substitute Minister (1915, Short) - John Drummond
 The Bluffers (1915, Short) - Tom Murdock
 The Silver Lining (1915, Short) - Richard Grant
 The Solution to the Mystery (1915, Short) - Franklyn Davis
 The Red Circle (1915, Serial)
 Matching Dreams (1916, Short) - Hugh Clayton
 Time and Tide (1916, Short) - Ned Lang
 A Sanitarium Scramble (1916, Short) - Frank Fellows
 Tangled Skeins (1916, Short) - Randall Wellington
 Her Father's Son (1916) - Lt. Richard Harkness
 The Road to Love (1916) - Karan
 The Serpent's Tooth (1917)
 Princess of the Dark (1917)
 Money Madness (1917)
 The Divorcee (1917)
 Sunlight's Last Raid (1917)
 The Flaming Omen (1917)
 When Men Are Tempted (1917)
 Baree, Son of Kazan (1918)
 The Sea Flower (1918)
 Desert Law (1918)
 The End of the Game (1919)
 His Majesty, Bunker Bean (1925)
 The Wife Who Wasn't Wanted (1925)
 A Woman of the Sea (1926)
 Oh! What a Nurse! (1926)
 Hell-Bent for Heaven (1926)
 Sunshine of Paradise Alley (1926)
 The Love Toy (1926)
 The Night Cry (1926)
 Exclusive Rights (1926)
 A Woman's Heart (1926)
 The Woman on Trial (1927)
 Wolves of the Air (1927)
 Stolen Pleasures (1927)
 Backstage (1927)
 In the First Degree (1927)
 Sailors' Wives (1928)
 Lucky Boy (1929)
 Reno (1930)
 Finger Prints (1931)
 Heroes of the Flames (1931)
 Igloo (1932)
 The Sea (1933)
 Art Trouble (1934) short film
 Born to Die (1934) narrator educational short
 Flight Command (1940)
 The Rookie Bear (1941) 
 Speaking of Animals and Their Families (1942)
 Barney Bear's Victory Garden (1942)
 War Dogs (1943)
 The Masked Marvel (1943)
The Sickle or the Cross (1949)

References

External links

1890 births
1958 deaths
American male film actors
American male radio actors
American male silent film actors
American male stage actors
Burials at Forest Lawn Memorial Park (Glendale)
20th-century American male actors
Male actors from Chicago
Metro-Goldwyn-Mayer cartoon studio people